Slađana Božović (born ) is a Swedish Serb beauty pageant. She competed in Miss Universe 2002 and in the second edition of the international Miss Earth 2002 beauty pageant where she won the title of Miss Water 2002.

Biography
She was born in Malmö, Sweden, to a family immigrating from Kragujevac, Central Serbia. Besides her parental Serbian language and her homeland Swedish language, Božović speaks English, Danish and Norwegian.

References

External links
Sladjana Bozovic
Official MissYu site
Miss Universe Sladjana

1980s births
Year of birth uncertain
Living people
Miss Earth 2002 contestants
Miss Universe 2002 contestants
People from Malmö
Swedish beauty pageant winners
Swedish people of Serbian descent